William Howard Northey (born May 27, 1959) is an American politician who served as the Under Secretary for Farm Production and Conservation in the United States Department of Agriculture from 2018 to 2021. A member of the Republican Party, he previously served as the Secretary of Agriculture of Iowa, first elected on November 7, 2006 and sworn in on January 2, 2007. In that position he led he led the Iowa Department of Agriculture and Land Stewardship.

Education and family
He graduated from Iowa State University with an undergraduate degree in agricultural business in 1981 and was a member of the FarmHouse Fraternity, serving as its president during his senior year. Northey received a Master in Business Administration degree from Southwest Minnesota State University in 2004.

Northey and his wife, Cindy, have three daughters.

Career in agriculture
Northey has been active in agriculture groups at the county, state, and national levels. From 1995 to 1996, Northey served as president of the National Corn Growers Association and was chairman of the group in 1996 and 1997. He also has led a number of committees for the Corn Growers. Northey was named a "Friend of Agriculture" by the Iowa Farm Bureau Political Action Committee in 2006 and has served in a number of Farm Bureau offices at the county and state level, including serving as president, vice president, and committee chairman of the Dickinson County Farm Bureau.

Northey has also served on the Iowa USDA Farm Service Agency State Committee, was a Dickinson County Soil and Water Conservation District Commissioner, and was a board member of Ag Ventures Alliance.

Northey was co-founder and president of Innovative Growers, LLC, which is an organization hatched from ISU Extension Leadership. Innovative Growers is a farmer-owned and farmer-managed group designed to capitalize on demand for the production of specialty grain products. On his farm, Northey employs the farming practices of reduced tillage, GPS, grid soil sampling and identity preserved production. He raises crops of corn and soybeans.

Iowa Secretary of Agriculture
Northey ran for Secretary of Agriculture on a platform of expanding opportunities in renewable energy, promoting conservation and stewardship, and telling the story of Iowa agriculture. He ran against Democrat Denise O'Brien. He won the election 50% to 48%. In 2010, he was re-elected by a margin of 60% to 35% against Democrat Francis Thicke. In 2014, Northey won re-election with over 62% of the vote.

U.S. Under Secretary of Agriculture
In September 2017, Northey was nominated to be Under Secretary of Agriculture for Farm and Foreign Agricultural Services by President Donald Trump. After a hold by Senator Ted Cruz was lifted on February 27, 2018, Northey was confirmed by the Senate.

As part of a reorganization of USDA, Secretary of Agriculture Sonny Perdue created a new Under Secretary for Trade and Foreign Agricultural Affairs, as directed by the 2014 Farm Bill. The creation of the new mission area prompted the realignment of several agencies under a newly named Under Secretary for Farm Production and Conservation (FPAC), the position which Northey currently holds. FPAC encompasses the USDA's domestic-facing agencies: the Farm Service Agency, the Natural Resources Conservation Service, and the Risk Management Agency.

Electoral history

References

External links
 Iowa Secretary of Agriculture profile
 Bill Northey campaign website 
 Biography at Ballotpedia
 Bill Northey at Influence Explorer

|-

1959 births
Farmers from Iowa
Iowa Republicans
Iowa State University alumni
Living people
Members of the Evangelical Free Church of America
People from Spirit Lake, Iowa
Place of birth missing (living people)
Secretaries of Agriculture of Iowa
Southwest Minnesota State University alumni
Trump administration personnel
United States Department of Agriculture officials